James Gibson (September 5, 1816 – 1897) was an American lawyer, newspaper editor and politician from New York.

Life
He was born on September 5, 1816, in Salem, Washington County, New York, the son of James Brown Gibson (died 1827) and Margaret (Townsend) Gibson (died 1825). He attended Washington Academy in Salem. He studied law with Samuel Stevens, was admitted to the bar in 1836, and practiced in Salem. From 1838 until the end of 1840, he published and edited the Washington County Post. On October 17, 1841, he married Jane Woodworth, and they had three children.

He entered politics as a Republican; and was Judge of the Washington County Court from 1852 to 1855. He was a member of the New York State Senate (12th D.) in 1866 and 1867; and was Chairman of the Committee on Claims. In 1872, he joined the Liberal Republican Party, and later became a Democrat.

He was Grand Master of the Grand Lodge of New York in from 1868 to 1870.

He died in 1897 in Salem, New York.

Sources
 The New York Civil List compiled by Franklin Benjamin Hough, Stephen C. Hutchins and Edgar Albert Werner (1870; pg. 436 and 444)
 Life Sketches of the State Officers, Senators, and Members of the Assembly of the State of New York, in 1867 by S. R. Harlow & H. H. Boone (pg. 97ff)
 Gibson genealogy, and bio at Schenectady History

External links
 The James Gibson papers at the New York State Library

1816 births
1897 deaths
Republican Party New York (state) state senators
People from Salem, New York
New York (state) state court judges
19th-century American newspaper editors
American male journalists
19th-century American male writers
19th-century American politicians
19th-century American judges